Willem Stroetinga (born 23 May 1985 in Drachten) is a Dutch former professional racing cyclist.

Major results

Track

2002
 1st  Scratch race, UCI Junior World Championships
2003
 UEC European Junior Championships
1st  Points race
2nd  Team pursuit
 National Junior Championships
1st  Keirin
3rd Points race
2004
 1st  Scratch race, National Championships
 1st UIV Cup
 2nd  Team pursuit, UEC European Under-23 Championships
 2nd Team pursuit, 2004–05 UCI Track Cycling World Cup Classics, Moscow
2005
 National Track Championships
1st  Scratch race
2nd Points race
 2004–05 UCI Track Cycling World Cup Classics
1st  Scratch race, Sydney
2nd  Team pursuit, Moscow
 3rd  Team pursuit, 2005–06 UCI Track Cycling World Cup Classics, Manchester
 3rd  Scratch race, UEC European Under-23 Championships
2006
 1st  Scratch race, UEC European Under-23 Championships
 National Championships
1st  Scratch race
1st  Madison (with Niki Terpstra)
 3rd  Scratch race, 2006–07 UCI Track Cycling World Cup Classics, Sydney
2007
 National Championships
1st  Madison (with Niki Terpstra)
2nd Scratch race
3rd Points race
3rd Individual pursuit
 2nd  Scratch race, UCI World Championships
 2nd  Scratch race, 2006–07 UCI Track Cycling World Cup Classics, Los Angeles
 2nd  Madison, UEC European Under-23 Championships (with Pim Ligthart)
2008
 1st  Omnium, UEC European Championships
 2007–08 UCI Track Cycling World Cup Classics
1st  Scratch race, Copenhagen
3rd  Madison, Copenhagen (with Peter Schep)
3rd  Scratch race, Los Angeles
 2008–09 UCI Track Cycling World Cup Classics, Manchester
1st  Scratch
3rd  Team pursuit
 National Championships
1st  Points race
1st  Individual pursuit
1st  Scratch
1st  Madison (with Peter Schep)
 2nd  Scratch race, UCI World Championships
2010
 2nd Scratch race, National Championships
2011
 2nd Six Days of Amsterdam
 2nd Six Days of Ghent (with Peter Schep)
 3rd  Team pursuit, 2011–12 UCI Track Cycling World Cup, Astana
 National Championships
3rd Points race
3rd Madison (with Peter Schep)
2012
 1st  Points race, National Championships
 1st Six Days of Rotterdam (with Peter Schep)
 3rd  Scratch, UCI World Championships
2013
 2nd Six Days of Ghent (with Iljo Keisse)
 2nd Six Days of Rotterdam (with Peter Schep)
2014
 1st Six Days of Bremen (with Leif Lampater)
2015
 3rd Six Days of Bremen (with Leif Lampater)
2016
 3rd  Scratch race, UEC European Championships
2017
 3rd Six Days of Copenhagen (with Yoeri Havik)
 3rd Six Days of Ghent (with Yoeri Havik)
 3rd Six Days of Rotterdam (with Dylan van Baarle)
2018
 1st Six Days of Berlin (with Yoeri Havik)
 1st Six Days of London (with Yoeri Havik)
 2nd Six Days of Rotterdam (with Yoeri Havik)
2019
 3rd  Scratch race, UEC European Championships
 3rd Six Days of London (with Yoeri Havik)
 3rd Six Days of Rotterdam (with Yoeri Havik)

Road

2005
 1st Ronde van Midden-Nederland
 1st Skara Grand Prix
 1st Stage 3 OZ Wielerweekend
 2nd Amicon-Van Keulen Omloop
 3rd Tour de Monde
 3rd Meeùs Race Lierop
 4th Parel van de Veluwe
2006
 1st Stage 4 Olympia's Tour
 1st Stage 3 Ronde van Antwerpen
 2nd Overall PWZ Zuidenveld Tour
 2nd Dorpenomloop door Drenthe
 3rd Omloop Schokland
2007
 1st Stage 2a Ronde van Antwerpen
 3rd Ronde van Noord-Holland
2009
 2nd Down Under Classic
 7th Neuseen Classics
 8th Dutch Food Valley Classic
 9th Ronde van het Groene Hart
2010
 4th Nationale Sluitingsprijs
 7th Trofeo Mallorca
2011
 1st Appelscha
 1st Ronde van Midden-Nederland
 Olympia's Tour
1st Stages 2, 3 & 4
 2nd Dutch Food Valley Classic
 3rd Nationale Sluitingsprijs
2012
 1st Nationale Sluitingsprijs
 1st Stage 1 Olympia's Tour
 3rd Overall Ronde van Overijssel
1st Stage 1
 3rd Ronde van Haarlemmerliede en Spaarnwoude
2013
 1st Stage 6 Olympia's Tour
 3rd Kernen Omloop Echt-Susteren
 4th Ruddervoorde Koerse
 9th Ronde van Noord-Holland
 10th Ronde van Limburg
2014
 1st Zuid Oost Drenthe Classic I
 1st Ronde van Midden-Nederland
 2nd Overall Olympia's Tour
1st  Points classification
1st Stages 3, 4, 5 & 6
2015
 1st Himmerland Rundt
 Olympia's Tour
1st  Points classification
1st Stages 1b, 3 & 5b
 2nd Zuid Oost Drenthe Classic I
 3rd GP Viborg
2016
 1st Stage 5 Ster ZLM Toer
 3rd Road race, National Road Championships
2018
 3rd Ronde van Noord-Holland
 4th Fyen Rundt
 5th Ronde van Midden-Nederland

See also
 List of Dutch Olympic cyclists

References

External links

1985 births
Living people
Dutch male cyclists
Cyclists at the 2008 Summer Olympics
Cyclists at the 2012 Summer Olympics
Cyclists at the 2016 Summer Olympics
Olympic cyclists of the Netherlands
Dutch cyclists at the UCI Track Cycling World Championships
People from Drachten
Cyclists from Friesland
21st-century Dutch people
20th-century Dutch people